The Spiritual Meadow is a 7th-century book by John Moschus. In Greek, it is titled  Leimōn pneumatikos (also the Leimonarion , or the "New Paradise") and in Latin, it is known as Pratum spirituale ("Spiritual Meadow"), occasionally abbreviated Prat. Spirit. John Moschus wrote the book during the 610s or 620s. It contains a rich assortment of over 200 narratives, biographies, and collections of sayings.

Editions
It was first edited by Fronton du Duc in Auctarium biblioth. patrum, II (Paris, 1624), 1057–1159. A better edition was brought out by Cotelier in Ecclesiae Graecae Monumenta, II (Paris, 1681), which is reprinted in J.-P. Migne, Patrologia Graeca. LXXXVII, III, 2851–3112. A Latin translation, by Ambrose Traversari, is printed in Migne, Patrologia Latina, LXXIV, 121–240, and an Italian version made from the Latin of Traversari (Venice, 1475; Vicenzo, 1479).

Summary
In the Spiritual Meadow, John Moschus narrates his personal experiences with many great ascetics whom he met during his extensive travels, mainly through Palestine, Sinai and Egypt, but also Kilikia and Syria, and repeats the edifying stories which these ascetics related to him.

The Spiritual Meadow contains stories of various patriarchs and bishops such as Theodotus of Antioch, Elias I of Jerusalem, Ephraim of Antioch, Gennadius of Constantinople, Eulogius of Alexandria, Patriarch Amos of Jerusalem, John Chrysostom, Pope Gregory I, Patriarch Apollinarius of Alexandria, Synesius, and Athanasius of Alexandria. There are also stories of Byzantine emperors such as Anastasius I Dicorus and Zeno.

The work teems with miracles and ecstatic visions and it gives a clear insight into the practices of Eastern monasticism, contains important data on the religious cult and ceremonies of the time, and acquaints us with the numerous heresies that threatened to disrupt the Church in the East.

Chapters
John Wortley's 1992 translation of the Spiritual Meadow contains the following 240 chapters.

The life of John the Elder and the cave of Sapsas
The elder who fed lions in his own cave
The life of Conon, priest of the community of Penthoucla
The vision of Abba Leontios
Abba Polychronios' story of the three monks
Another story of Abba Polychronios
The life and death of an elder who would not be higoumen of the lavra of the towers
The life of Abba Myrogenes who had dropsy
The wondrous charity of a holy elder
The life of Barnabas the Anchorite
The life of Abba Hagiodoulos
A saying of Abba Olympios
The life of Abba Mark the Anchorite
A brother assailed by a lascivious spirit who was stricken with leprosy
The wondrous deed of Abba Conon
Abba Nicolas' story
The life of a great elder
The life of another elder at the monastery of the lavra who slept with lions
Abba Elijah's story about himself
The conversion of a soldier (whose life is briefly described) when God worked a miracle for him
The death of an anchorite and of his slayer
The life of another elder named Conon
The life of Theodoulos the Monk
An elder who lived at the cells of Choziba
A brother at the monastery of Choziba, the words of <the prayer of> the holy offering and Abba John
The life of Theophanes, his wondrous vision and concerning intercourse with heretics
The life of the priest of the Mardardos Estate
A wondrous deed of Abba Julian the Stylite
A miracle of the most Holy Eucharist
The life of Isidore the Monk of Melitene and another miracle of the most Holy Sacrament
The conversion and life of Mary the Harlot
The conversion and life of Babylas the Actor and of Cometa and Nicosa his concubines
The life of the holy bishop Theodotos
The life of the godly Alexander, Patriarch of Antioch
The life of Elias, Archbishop of Jerusalem and concerning Flavian, Patriarch of Antioch
The life of Ephraim, Patriarch of Antioch and how he converted a Stylite monk from the impiety of the Severan heresy
The life of a bishop who left his throne and came to the Holy City where he changed his clothes and became a builder's labourer
The death of the impious Emperor Anastasios
The life of a monk of the monastery of Abba Severian and how he was prudently restrained by a country-girl from sinning with her
The life of Abba Cosmas the Eunuch
the life of Abba Paul of Anazarbos
The life of Abba Auxanon
The horrible death of Thalilaios, the impious Archbishop of Thessalonica
The life of an elder, a monk living near the city of Antinoë and concerning his prayer for a dead brother
The life of a monk, a recluse on the Mount of Olives and concerning the veneration of an icon of the most Holy Mother of God
The wondrous vision of Abba Cyriacos of the lavra of Calamon and concerning two books of the impious Nestorios
A miracle of the holy mother of God against Gaianas the Actor who was blaspheming her in the theatre
Another miracle of the Holy Mother of God by which Cosmiana, wife of Germanos, was compelled to return to the true faith from the Severan heresy
The wondrous vision of the duke of Palestine by which he was compelled to renounce the aforementioned heresy and to enter into communion with the Church of Christ
The vision and a saying of Abba George the Recluse
The life of Abba Julian, the elder of the Egyptians' monastery
A saying of Abba Elias the Solitary
The life of Cyriacos the Elder from the monastery of Saint Sabas
The life of the monks of Scete and concerning an elder <named> Ammonios
The life of an elder who stayed at Scete and concerning Abba Irenaeus
The life of John, the disciple of a great elder who lived in the village of Parasêma
The death of Symeon the Stylite and concerning Abba Julian, another Stylite
Concerning Julian again
The life of Abba Thalilaios the Cilician
The strange deed of an anchoress as a result of which a youth who loved her became a monk out of remorse; and concerning Julian again
The life of Abba Leontios the Cilician
The life of Abba Stephan, priest of the lavra of the Eliotes
Concerning the same
Concerning the same
Concerning the same
The life of Abba Theodosios the Solitary
Concerning the same
Concerning the same
The life of Abba Palladios and of an elder of Thessalonica, a recluse named David
The life of a Mesopotamian monk, Addas the Recluse
The beautiful saying of a murderer to a monk who followed him when he was being led to execution
Abba Palladios' story of an old man who committed murder and falsely accused a youth of the same crime
The life of John the soldier of Alexandria
A true saying of the same abba, Palladios, concerning heresies
A miracle of the Lord for the wife and daughter of one of the faithful who was accustomed to entertaining monks
The drowning of Mary
The story of three blind men and of how they became blind
The amazing miracle of a dead girl who detained her despoiler and would not let him go until he promised to become a monk
A tremendous and stupendous miracle of the most holy sacrament under Dionysios, Bishop of Seleucia
The spring conferred on the brothers of the monastery in Skopelos at the prayers of Theodosios, their abbot
A well that filled with water when an icon of the same Abba Theodosios was let down into it
The life of John, an elder at the Skopelos monastery
Concerning the same
The life and death of an anchorite of the same monastery, a servant of God
How the wheat of the same monastery germinated because the customary almsgiving had been suspended
Concerning another anchorite of the same monastery
The finding of the corpse of the anchorite John the Humble
The life of Abba Thomas, the steward of a community near Apamea and the miracle of his corpse after he died
The finding of a holy anchorite on Mount Amanon
The death of two anchorites on Mount Ptergion
The life of Abba Gregory the Anchorite and of Thalilaios, his disciple
The life of Brother George the Cappadocian and the finding of the body of Peter the Solitary of the Holy Jordan
The life of Abba Sisinios (who declined a bishopric) and of his disciple
The life of Abba Julian, the Bishop of Bostra
The life of Patrick, an elder at the monastery of Skopelos
Concerning the same <father> and also Julian, the blind Arab
The life and death of two brothers who swore never to be separated from each other
Concerning the surviving brother
The life of Anthony, an elder at the monastery of Skopelos
The life of Peter, the monk of Pontus
The life of Pardos, the Roman monk
The story of Sophronios the Sophist about what happened to him on the road
The life and qualities of Abba Strategios
The life of Abba Nonnos the Priest
The life of a holy elder named Christopher, a Roman
Abba Theodore's story of the Syrian monk, Severian
The life of Abba Gerasimos
The life of a virgin priest and of his wife, who was also a virgin
The life of Abba George who was never perturbed
Various sayings of an Egyptian elder
The deed of a bald man dressed in sack-cloth
The life and death of Leo, a Cappadocian monk
An injunction of Abba John of Petra
The life of Abba Daniel, the Egyptian
Injunctions of Abba John, the Cicilian
The brother who was falsely accused of taking a piece of gold
A brother with a demon, cured by Abba Andrew
The life of Menas the Deacon, a monk of Raithou
The demon disguised as a monk which came at the call of an elder at Raithou
Three dead monks found by fishermen at Paran
The life and death of Gregory, the Byzantine, and of another Gregory, his disciple, from Paran
Concerning two monks who went naked into church to make their communion and were not seen by anybody, except by Abba Stephan
The life of Abba Zosimos the Cilician
A story of the same <elder>
The beautiful deed of Abba Sergios the Anchorite
The unusual response of Abba Orentês of Mount Sinai
The life of Abba George of the holy mountain of Sinai and of another person, one from Phrygian Galatia
The life of Adelphios, Bishop of Arabessos and concerning the blessed John Chrysostom
The life of a Stylite
Admonitions of Abba Athanasios and his wondrous vision
The life of Abba Zachaios of Holy Zion
Concerning the same <elder>
The holy monk who immobilised a Saracen hunter for two days
The life of Theodore the Anchorite
The virgins who wanted to leave the monastery and were possessed by demons
The love of Abba Sisinios for a Saracen woman
Abba John's story about Abba Calinicos
Abba Sergios the Anchorite and a gentle monk who was baptised
Abba Sergios' prophecy concerning Gregory, higoumen of the monastery of Paran
The life of the same Gregory, Patriarch of Theoupolis
The judicious reply of Abba Olympios
Another judicious reply from Abba Alexander
David, the robber-chief, who later became a monk
Injunctions of one of the elders who were at the cells
The life of the blessed Gennadios, Patriarch of Constantinople, and of his reader, Charisios
The vision of Eulogios, Patriarch of Alexandria
The wondrous correction of a letter written by the blessed Roman pontiff to Flaviano
The vision of Theodore, Bishop of Dara, concerning the same most blessed Leo
The amazing tale of Amos, Patriarch of Jerusalem concerning the most sacred Leo, the Roman pontiff
The life and holiness of the Bishop of Romilla
John the Persian's story of the most blessed Gregory, Bishop of the City of Rome
The life and sayings of Marcellus the Scetiote, abba of the monastery of Monidia
The answer of a monk of the monastery of Raithou to a secular brother
The life of Theodore who lived in the world, a man of God
Abba Jordanes' story of the Saracens who killed each other
The reply of an elder to two philosophers
The story of two monks of the Syrians' monastery at Soubiba about a dog who showed a brother the way
An ass in the service of the monastery called Mardes
The life of Abba Sophronios the Solitary and some injunctions of Menas
How a demon appeared to an elder in the form of a very black boy
The life of Abba Isaac of Thebes and how a demon appeared to him in the form of a youth
The response of Abba Theodore of Pentapolis to the question of abstaining from wine
The life of Abba Paul the Greek
The reply of Abba Victor the Solitary to a faint-hearted monk
The life of a robber named Cyriacos
The life of a robber who became a monk and was later beheaded in lay clothes
The life and death of Abba Poemen, the solitary
Sayings of Abba Alexander the Elder
The life of a blind elder at the monastery of Abba Sisoës
The life of a holy woman who died in the wilderness
The life of two remarkable men, Theodore the Philosopher and Zoilos the Reader
The life of the above-mentioned Cosmas, the lawyer
The wondrous deed of Theodore the Anchorite who made fresh water at sea by his prayer
The deed of a religious ship-master who prayed to the Lord for rain
A story about the Emperor Zeno who was much given to almsgiving
The beautiful story of Abba Andrew about ten travellers, of whom one was a Hebrew
The bad death of an Egyptian monk who wanted to occupy the cell of Evagrios, the heretic
The life of an elder of the community of the Scolarii, a simple man
The life of a woman religious <sanctimonialis feminae> who was from the Holy City
The life of John the Anchorite who lived in a cave on the Socho Estate
Concerning the same
The life of Abba Alexander the Cilician who was besieged by a demon when he was near to death
The wondrous deed of David, the Egyptian
The life of Abba John the Eunuch and of a young man who resolved never to drink and of another elder greatly given to prayer
The life of a faithful woman who, with wondrous wisdom, converted her gentile husband to the faith
The life of Moschos, the merchant of Tyre
The teaching of Abba John of Cyzicos on how to acquire virtue
The life of two brothers who were Syrian money-dealers
The life of a woman who remained
The miracle of some wood given to Abba Brocha, the Egyptian
A brief life of Saint John Chrysostom, Patriarch of Constantinople
The story of a monk of the monastery of the godly Pope Gregory, and of how he was absolved of excommunication after death
The wondrous deed of charity by the holy Abba Apollinarios, Patriarch of Alexandria, for a rich young man reduced to penury
The exhortation of an elder who lived at Scete to a monk, not to enter taverns
The life of Evagrios the Philosopher who was converted to the Christian faith by Synesios, Bishop of Cyrene
The miracle which happened to the boys of Apamea who recited the prayer of consecration in a game
Rufinus' anecdote of Saint Athanasios and other boys who were with him
The reply of Saint Athansios, Bishop of Alexandria, to <the question of> whether one can be baptised without faith
The story of a simple elder who used to see angels when he offered the Eucharist
How a young goldsmith became the adopted son of a man of patrician rank
The life of a most noble man of Constantinople whose father, when he was dying, left him the Lord Jesus Christ as his guardian
The life of the servant of God, Abibas, the son of a worldly man
The story of a jeweller who, by a wise decision, saved his life at sea
How a religious woman who feared God restrained a monk from lascivious desire
Concerning another wise woman who, by judicious advice, turned aside a monk who was harassing her
A stratagem by which a great lady was taught humility
The life of an Alexandrine girl who was received from the sacred font by angels
The fine response of an elder to a brother besieged by depression
The fine exhortation of a certain holy elder on the words of the Lord's Prayer: lead us not into temptation
How a holy bishop overcame another one who was opposing him-by humility
Concerning an elder of great virtues who got a brother who had stolen things from him out of prison
Of two brothers who exercised marvellous patience in dealing with robbers
Why there are signs and prodigies from God in the Holy Church
The miracle of the baptismal font in the city of Cobana
Another miracle: of the baptistry of the village of Cedrebat
Some good advice about neither being obdurate nor remaining obdurate
The best advice of an elder: that a monk should not go near a woman
How Abba Sergios pacified a cursing farmer by patience
How a brother was reconciled with a deacon who was aggrieved at him
Theodor Nissen 1, BHG 1442b
Theodor Nissen 2, BHG 1442c
Theodor Nissen 3, Nau 342
Theodor Nissen 4, BHG l440r
Theodor Nissen 5, BHG 1440q
Theodor Nissen 6, BHG 1440s
Theodor Nissen 7, BHG l448i/1440kt
Theodor Nissen 8, BHG l322n
Theodor Nissen 9, BHG 1450ze
Theodor Nissen 10, BHG 1442cb
Theodor Nissen 12, BHG 1450p
Theodor Nissen 13, BHG 1450u
Elpidio Mioni 1
Elpidio Mioni 2, BHG 1322b
Elpidio Mioni 3, BHG 1448z
Elpidio Mioni 4, BHG 1448z
Elpidio Mioni 5, BHG l442m
Elpidio Mioni 6, BHG l442mb
Elpidio Mioni 7, BHG 1442f
Elpidio Mioni 8
Elpidio Mioni 9
Elpidio Mioni 10
Elpidio Mioni 11, BHG 2102d
Elpidio Mioni 12, BHG 1076k

References

7th-century books
Byzantine Rite
Christian hagiography
Works by the Church Fathers
Byzantine literature
Eastern Christian monasticism